Greenland Hills is a neighborhood in east Dallas, Texas (USA).  It is bounded on the west by North Central Expressway (US 75), on the south by Vanderbilt Avenue, on the east by Greenville Avenue and on the north by McCommas Boulevard.

The area is also known as the M Streets due to two major streets (McCommas and Monticello) and many of the minor streets starting with the letter M.

The neighborhood also forms the M Streets Conservation District, per the M Streets Conservation District Ordinance.

About 
The homes original to Greenland Hills date back to the 1920s, with most representing the Tudor architectural style. Original details, such as stained glass windows, arches, and hardwood floors have been conserved.. The M streets has a population of about 6,000 people and the median house owner-occupied home value is $480,000.

Neighborhoods 

The area of the M-Streets in U.S. ZIP Code 75206 has many smaller neighborhoods, each with their own character and housing styles.

Education

Public schools 

The neighborhood is served by the Dallas Independent School District (DISD) for public schools.

Children within the neighborhood are served by:

 Mockingbird Elementary School (K-5) in Lower Greenville - It is in proximity to, but outside of, Greenland Hills. 
 J. L. Long Middle School (6-8)
 Woodrow Wilson High School (9-12)

Eduardo Mata Montessori School, a K-8 school, gives second admission priority to people zoned to Woodrow Wilson High. Therefore, Junius Heights is one of the neighborhoods with priority for the school.

Private schools 

Nearby private schools include: St. Thomas Aquinas Catholic School (K-8), Dallas Christian Academy (K-12), Bishop Lynch High School (9-12), and Lakehill Preparatory School (K-12).

Colleges and universities 

Greenland Hills is in the Dallas County Community College District, which offers academic, continuing education, and adult education programs through seven community colleges and 14 campuses in Dallas County.

Religion 

Many houses of worship are nearby including: Ridgecrest Baptist Church, Unity Church of Christianity, Greenland Hills United Methodist Church, Skillman Church of Christ, St. Andrew's Presbyterian Church, Providence Presbyterian Church, First United Lutheran Church, Northridge Presbyterian Church, Wilshire Baptist Church, New St. Peters Presbyterian Church, Lakewood United Methodist Church, Lakewood Presbyterian Church, and St. Thomas Aquinas Catholic Church.

Government 

 Dallas City Council: District 14: Councilmember:  Paul Ridley
 Dallas County Commissioners Court: Precinct 2: J.J. Koch
 Texas State Representative: House District 108: Morgan Meyer
 Texas State Senator: District 16: Nathan Johnson
 Texas U.S. Representative District 32: Colin Allred
 Texas U.S. Senators: John Cornyn and Ted Cruz
 Texas State Board of Education: District 12 Member: Geraldine Miller 2013–2018, Pam Little 2019-

Parks and recreation 

 Glencoe Park, established in 1944, is a 14.1 acre neighborhood park managed by the Dallas Parks and Recreation Department.  Features included: basketball, picnic tables, water fountain, playground portalets, rugby field, softball field, tennis court, and walking trails.
 Katy Trail
 Santa Fe Trail, beginning at White Rock Lake and winding through East Dallas neighborhoods, connects to historic Deep Elum and Fair Park by way of a 12 foot wide, 4.5 mile long paved path over the former Santa Fe Railroad line.
 White Rock Lake

Notable people

References

External links 
 Greenland Hills Neighborhood Association
 M Streets Conservation District Ordinance
 M Streets Conservation District Map
 City of Dallas Conservation District Ordinances

Historic districts in Texas